Quik (also Romanized as qū’īk; also known as Kū’īkan کویکان) is a village in Solduz Rural District, in the Central District of Naqadeh County, West Azerbaijan Province, Iran. At the 2006 census, its population was 550, in 102 families.

References 

Populated places in Naqadeh County